Shudufhadzo Musida (born 18 July 1996) is a South African model and beauty pageant titleholder who was crowned Miss South Africa 2020. She is the second  title holder from the province of Limpopo - the first being Bokang Montjane. She is the first title holder whose first language is Venda, and was selected to represent South Africa in Miss World 2022. Musida is the first bald woman to win Miss South Africa. She is a dedicated advocate and spokeswoman for mental health awareness and empowering women and children.

Early life 
Shudufhadzo Musida was born on 18 July 1996. She is from Ha-Masia village, Vhembe District Municipality of the Limpopo province. Musida studied at the University of Pretoria where she earned a Bachelor of Social Science degree in Philosophy, Politics and Economics. Before winning Miss South Africa, she was completing an Honours degree in International Relations at the University of Witwatersrand.  She is one of two sisters; her mother Thandi is a real estate agent. She values her Venda heritage and enjoys traditional Venda cuisine.

Career 
In October 2020, at the Miss South Africa finals held at Table Bay Hotel in Cape Town, Musida won the crown. Before the finals, she had won the public vote. Prizes for winning the final included 1 million rand, and use of a fully furnished Sandton apartment and a Mercedes-Benz C200 Cabriolet for one year. Musida is an advocate for mental health awareness and the educational and economic empowerment of children and women. Former Miss South Africa and Miss Universe 2019 Zozibini Tunzi is cited as a role model by Musida. She competed and represented South Africa and finished in the top 40 of the Miss World 2022 pageant.

References

External links

1996 births
Living people
Miss South Africa winners
Miss World 2022 delegates
South African beauty pageant winners
South African female models
Venda people